The Babushkinsky Constituency (No.196) is a Russian legislative constituency in Moscow. It is based in North-Eastern Moscow.

Members elected

Election results

1993

|-
! colspan=2 style="background-color:#E9E9E9;text-align:left;vertical-align:top;" |Candidate
! style="background-color:#E9E9E9;text-align:left;vertical-align:top;" |Party
! style="background-color:#E9E9E9;text-align:right;" |Votes
! style="background-color:#E9E9E9;text-align:right;" |%
|-
|style="background-color:#0085BE"|
|align=left|Yuly Nisnevich
|align=left|Choice of Russia
|36,413
|14.58%
|-
|style="background-color:"|
|align=left|Nina Milyukova
|align=left|Independent
| -
|11.63%
|-
| colspan="5" style="background-color:#E9E9E9;"|
|- style="font-weight:bold"
| colspan="3" style="text-align:left;" | Total
| 249,768
| 100%
|-
| colspan="5" style="background-color:#E9E9E9;"|
|- style="font-weight:bold"
| colspan="4" |Source:
|
|}

1995

|-
! colspan=2 style="background-color:#E9E9E9;text-align:left;vertical-align:top;" |Candidate
! style="background-color:#E9E9E9;text-align:left;vertical-align:top;" |Party
! style="background-color:#E9E9E9;text-align:right;" |Votes
! style="background-color:#E9E9E9;text-align:right;" |%
|-
|style="background-color:"|
|align=left|Telman Gdlyan
|align=left|Independent
|63,991
|21.32%
|-
|style="background-color:#3A46CE"|
|align=left|Yuly Nisnevich (incumbent)
|align=left|Democratic Choice of Russia – United Democrats
|34,063
|11.35%
|-
|style="background-color:"|
|align=left|Aleksey Shishkov
|align=left|Independent
|28,603
|9.53%
|-
|style="background-color:"|
|align=left|Yevgeny Zaikin
|align=left|Independent
|24,189
|8.06%
|-
|style="background-color:#FE4801"|
|align=left|Aleksandr Porfirov
|align=left|Pamfilova–Gurov–Lysenko
|20,402
|6.80%
|-
|style="background-color:"|
|align=left|Gennady Shalygin
|align=left|Yabloko
|20,167
|6.72%
|-
|style="background-color:#295EC4"|
|align=left|Valeriya Novodvorskaya
|align=left|Party of Economic Freedom
|11,240
|3.74%
|-
|style="background-color:"|
|align=left|Nikolay Domashenkov
|align=left|Independent
|7,761
|2.59%
|-
|style="background-color:"|
|align=left|Larisa Dementyeva
|align=left|Independent
|7,468
|2.49%
|-
|style="background-color:#FFF22E"|
|align=left|Konstantin Kalachev
|align=left|Beer Lovers Party
|6,859
|2.28%
|-
|style="background-color:"|
|align=left|Valery Yakovlev
|align=left|Independent
|6,850
|2.28%
|-
|style="background-color:"|
|align=left|Mikhail Astafyev
|align=left|Zemsky Sobor
|5,736
|1.91%
|-
|style="background-color:"|
|align=left|Aleksandr Artsibashev
|align=left|Agrarian Party
|4,763
|1.59%
|-
|style="background-color:"|
|align=left|Anatoly Panov
|align=left|Liberal Democratic Party
|4,277
|1.42%
|-
|style="background-color:"|
|align=left|Aleksandr Zholkov
|align=left|Independent
|4,238
|1.41%
|-
|style="background-color:"|
|align=left|Andrey Lumpov
|align=left|Faith, Work, Conscience
|3,433
|1.14%
|-
|style="background-color:"|
|align=left|Larisa Babukh
|align=left|Education - Future of Russia
|2,965
|0.99%
|-
|style="background-color:"|
|align=left|Galina Skorokhodova
|align=left|Independent
|2,453
|0.82%
|-
|style="background-color:"|
|align=left|Vladimir Voronin
|align=left|Independent
|2,051
|0.68%
|-
|style="background-color:"|
|align=left|Orest Kuznetsov
|align=left|Independent
|973
|0.32%
|-
|style="background-color:"|
|align=left|Yury Gorodetsky
|align=left|Independent
|789
|0.26%
|-
|style="background-color:#00A200"|
|align=left|Sergey Kanayev
|align=left|Transformation of the Fatherland
|787
|0.26%
|-
|style="background-color:#DD137B"|
|align=left|Pavel Kudyukin
|align=left|Social Democrats
|654
|0.22%
|-
|style="background-color:#000000"|
|colspan=2 |against all
|30,065
|10.01%
|-
| colspan="5" style="background-color:#E9E9E9;"|
|- style="font-weight:bold"
| colspan="3" style="text-align:left;" | Total
| 300,201
| 100%
|-
| colspan="5" style="background-color:#E9E9E9;"|
|- style="font-weight:bold"
| colspan="4" |Source:
|
|}

1999

|-
! colspan=2 style="background-color:#E9E9E9;text-align:left;vertical-align:top;" |Candidate
! style="background-color:#E9E9E9;text-align:left;vertical-align:top;" |Party
! style="background-color:#E9E9E9;text-align:right;" |Votes
! style="background-color:#E9E9E9;text-align:right;" |%
|-
|style="background-color:#3B9EDF"|
|align=left|Sergey Shirokov
|align=left|Fatherland – All Russia
|110,153
|36.99%
|-
|style="background-color:#1042A5"|
|align=left|Yuly Nisnevich
|align=left|Union of Right Forces
|31,961
|10.73%
|-
|style="background-color:"|
|align=left|Aleksandr Droban
|align=left|Independent
|22,364
|7.51%
|-
|style="background-color:#FF4400"|
|align=left|Valery Shaposhnikov
|align=left|Andrey Nikolayev and Svyatoslav Fyodorov Bloc
|16,569
|5.56%
|-
|style="background-color:"|
|align=left|Irina Volkova
|align=left|Independent
|16,025
|5.38%
|-
|style="background-color:"|
|align=left|Anna Alyoshina
|align=left|Independent
|10,430
|3.50%
|-
|style="background-color:#020266"|
|align=left|Anatoly Firsov
|align=left|Russian Socialist Party
|9,777
|3.28%
|-
|style="background-color:"|
|align=left|Nikolay Morozov
|align=left|Independent
|8,347
|2.80%
|-
|style="background-color:"|
|align=left|Vladimir Gorshkov
|align=left|Independent
|7,639
|2.57%
|-
|style="background-color:#084284"|
|align=left|Valery Korobeynikov
|align=left|Spiritual Heritage
|3,995
|1.34%
|-
|style="background-color:#000000"|
|colspan=2 |against all
|51,947
|17.44%
|-
| colspan="5" style="background-color:#E9E9E9;"|
|- style="font-weight:bold"
| colspan="3" style="text-align:left;" | Total
| 297,806
| 100%
|-
| colspan="5" style="background-color:#E9E9E9;"|
|- style="font-weight:bold"
| colspan="4" |Source:
|
|}

2003

|-
! colspan=2 style="background-color:#E9E9E9;text-align:left;vertical-align:top;" |Candidate
! style="background-color:#E9E9E9;text-align:left;vertical-align:top;" |Party
! style="background-color:#E9E9E9;text-align:right;" |Votes
! style="background-color:#E9E9E9;text-align:right;" |%
|-
|style="background-color:"|
|align=left|Sergey Shirokov (incumbent)
|align=left|United Russia
|81,561
|31.42%
|-
|style="background-color:"|
|align=left|Sergey Mitrokhin
|align=left|Yabloko
|75,973
|29.27%
|-
|style="background-color: #00A1FF"|
|align=left|Andrey Shirokov
|align=left|Party of Russia's Rebirth-Russian Party of Life
|25,921
|9.99%
|-
|style="background-color:"|
|align=left|Maksim Suraykin
|align=left|Communist Party
|21,966
|8.46%
|-
|style="background-color:#000000"|
|colspan=2 |against all
|48,391
|18.64%
|-
| colspan="5" style="background-color:#E9E9E9;"|
|- style="font-weight:bold"
| colspan="3" style="text-align:left;" | Total
| 260,628
| 100%
|-
| colspan="5" style="background-color:#E9E9E9;"|
|- style="font-weight:bold"
| colspan="4" |Source:
|
|}

2016

|-
! colspan=2 style="background-color:#E9E9E9;text-align:left;vertical-align:top;" |Candidate
! style="background-color:#E9E9E9;text-align:left;vertical-align:top;" |Party
! style="background-color:#E9E9E9;text-align:right;" |Votes
! style="background-color:#E9E9E9;text-align:right;" |%
|-
|style="background-color:"|
|align=left|Ivan Teterin
|align=left|United Russia
|58,902
|34.58%
|-
|style="background-color:"|
|align=left|Sergey Mitrokhin
|align=left|Yabloko
|20,997
|12.33%
|-
|style="background-color:"|
|align=left|Aleksandr Potapov
|align=left|Communist Party
|20,348
|11.95%
|-
|style="background:"|
|align=left|Nikolay Lyaskin
|align=left|People's Freedom Party
|13,251
|7.78%
|-
|style="background-color:"|
|align=left|Oleg Belyayev
|align=left|A Just Russia
|13,182
|7.74%
|-
|style="background-color:"|
|align=left|Aleksandr Sapronov
|align=left|Liberal Democratic Party
|12,441
|7.30%
|-
|style="background:"| 
|align=left|Marina Drumova
|align=left|The Greens
|7,472
|4.39%
|-
|style="background-color:"|
|align=left|Yanis Yuksha
|align=left|Rodina
|6,729
|3.95%
|-
|style="background:;"| 
|align=left|Yury Gubanov
|align=left|Communists of Russia
|4,959
|2.91%
|-
|style="background-color:"|
|align=left|Vladimir Lakeev
|align=left|Independent
|2,450
|1.44%
|-
|style="background:"| 
|align=left|Nikolay Skorik
|align=left|Patriots of Russia
|2,334
|1.37%
|-
|style="background:#00A650;"| 
|align=left|Oleg Cherdakov
|align=left|Civilian Power
|1,180
|0.69%
|-
| colspan="5" style="background-color:#E9E9E9;"|
|- style="font-weight:bold"
| colspan="3" style="text-align:left;" | Total
| 171,192
| 100%
|-
| colspan="5" style="background-color:#E9E9E9;"|
|- style="font-weight:bold"
| colspan="4" |Source:
|
|}

2021

|-
! colspan=2 style="background-color:#E9E9E9;text-align:left;vertical-align:top;" |Candidate
! style="background-color:#E9E9E9;text-align:left;vertical-align:top;" |Party
! style="background-color:#E9E9E9;text-align:right;" |Votes
! style="background-color:#E9E9E9;text-align:right;" |%
|-
|style="background-color: " |
|align=left|Timofey Bazhenov
|align=left|United Russia
|92,522
|38.40%
|-
|style="background-color: " |
|align=left|Valery Rashkin
|align=left|Communist Party
|59,086
|24.53%
|-
|style="background-color: " |
|align=left|Georgy Fyodorov
|align=left|A Just Russia — For Truth
|15,025
|6.24%
|-
|style="background-color: "|
|align=left|Viktoria Mironova
|align=left|Russian Party of Freedom and Justice
|12,683
|5.26%
|-
|style="background-color: "|
|align=left|Aleksey Rvachev
|align=left|New People
|11,645
|4.83%
|-
|style="background-color: " |
|align=left|Aleksey Kryukov
|align=left|Liberal Democratic Party
|10,241
|4.25%
|-
|style="background-color: " |
|align=left|Kirill Yankov
|align=left|Yabloko
|9,175
|3.81%
|-
|style="background-color: " |
|align=left|Sergey Malinkovich
|align=left|Communists of Russia
|6,700
|2.78%
|-
|style="background-color: " |
|align=left|Elvira Vikhareva
|align=left|Party of Growth
|5,777
|2.40%
|-
|style="background: ;"| 
|align=left|Anton Tarasov
|align=left|The Greens
|4,796
|1.99%
|-
|style="background: ;"| 
|align=left|Yelena Strelnikova
|align=left|Green Alternative
|4,713
|1.96%
|-
|style="background: ;"| 
|align=left|Yelena Ivanova
|align=left|Civic Platform
|2,377
|0.99%
|-
| colspan="5" style="background-color:#E9E9E9;"|
|- style="font-weight:bold"
| colspan="3" style="text-align:left;" | Total
| 240,912
| 100%
|-
| colspan="5" style="background-color:#E9E9E9;"|
|- style="font-weight:bold"
| colspan="4" |Source:
|
|}

Notes

Sources
196. Бабушкинский одномандатный избирательный округ

References

Russian legislative constituencies
Politics of Moscow